Hans Ritter von Hemmer, (26 June 1869 – 15 December 1931), son of Colonel Anthony Hemmer, was an officer in the Royal Bavarian Army and Knight Commander of the Military Order of Max Joseph.

He was born in Munich, Kingdom of Bavaria and attended school at the humanistic Gymnasium in Regensburg, then joined on 12 August 1888 the 11th Bavarian Infantry Regiment (not the same as the 11th Bavarian Infantry Division of World War I). In 1896 he was sent for 3 years training at the Bavarian war academy, followed in 1900 by two years at the Royal Bavarian Army General Staff, another and from 1909 he worked at the Prussian General Staff in Berlin. Then, from 19 September 1912 he was at the Bavarian Army General Staff.

In World War I he participated in the fighting in August 1914 at the Battle of Lorraine, and part of the Somme. On 30 November 1914 he was promoted to lieutenant colonel and took over as Head of the General Staff of the I Royal Bavarian Reserve Corps.

On 6 July 1915, he became the Chief of General Staff of South Army in Galicia under General Felix Graf von Bothmer. On the Eastern Front in 1916 he was in heavy fighting during the fighting in Galicia, the Carpathians and Sereth, today in Romania.

In 1917 he was involved in the battles for Berezhany, and other places now in Ukraine and was awarded the Pour le Mérite, and promoted to Colonel. Then he coordinated the operation planned in eastern Galicia against the  Russians. After the peace of Brest-Litovsk with the Bolsheviks, he moved in February 1918 back to the western front and was chief of the General Staff of 19th Army (again with General von Bothmer) covering Lorraine. In this role, he oversaw the situation in Lorraine, and, after the armistice on November 11, he and von Bothmer oversaw the withdrawal back to Bavarian territory.

After the war he served the Reichswehr of the Weimar Republic and in 1920 was promoted to Major General. He died on 15 December 1931.

Notes

References

Bibliography
Rudolf v. Kramer, Otto Freiherr von Waldenfels, Der königlich bayerische Militär-Max-Joseph-Orden, Selbstverlag des k. b. Militär-Max-Joseph-Ordens, München 1966
Konrad Krafft von Dellmensingen, Friedrichfranz Feeser, Das Bayernbuch vom Weltkriege 1914–1918, Chr. Belser AG, Verlagsbuchhandlung, Stuttgart 1930

1869 births
1931 deaths
Military personnel from Munich
Recipients of the Pour le Mérite (military class)
German Army personnel of World War I
Bavarian generals
[[Category:Commanders of the Military Order of Max Joseph